The Tongala Football Club, nicknamed the Blues, is an Australian rules football club playing in the Murray Football League.

History

The Tongala Football Club was formed in 1894 in a meeting at Mangan's Victoria Hotel, Tongala, with games played at Tongala Recreation Reserve. Tongala initially  wore a red jumper with black horizontal bars in 1894.

In 1919, Tongala's application for admission into the Goulburn Valley Football League was rejected on the grounds that Tongala was not a strong enough team.

The club has participated in a number of local football leagues over the years with great success.

Football competitions timeline
Tongala FC have competed in the following football competitions –

1910 to 1914: Kyabram District Junior Football Association 
1915 to 1918: Club in recess, due to World War I 
1919 to 1923: Kyabram District Junior Football Association
1924 to 1932: Goulburn Valley Football League 
1933 to 1935: Echuca and District Football League
1936 to 1940: Kyabram District Football Association
1941 to 1944: Club in recess, due to World War II
1945 to 1946: Kyabram District Football Association
1946 to 2005: Goulburn Valley Football League 
2006 to present day: Murray Football League

Football Premierships
Seniors
Murray Football League
Nil
Goulburn Valley Football League
1949, 1961, 1983, 1984
Kyabram District Football Association
1936, 1937, 1939, 1940, 1945
Kyabram District Junior Football Association
1920, 1923

References

External links

 

Murray Football League clubs
1894 establishments in Australia
Australian rules football clubs established in 1894
Goulburn Valley Football League clubs